Diocese of Perth or Archdiocese of Perth could refer to:
Anglican Diocese of Perth
Roman Catholic Archdiocese of Perth